The Onyx Head (German: Der Onyxknopf) is a 1917 German silent crime film directed by Joe May and starring Max Landa, Bruno Kastner and Leopoldine Konstantin. It was part of a series of Joe Deebs detective films.

The film's sets were designed by the art director Uwe Jens Krafft.

Cast
In alphabetical order
Hugo Flink
Bruno Kastner
Leopoldine Konstantin as Geliebte von Deebs 
Max Landa as Joe Deebs 
Rudolf Lettinger
Eva Maria
Fritz Schulz

References

External links

Films of the German Empire
German silent feature films
Films directed by Joe May
German crime films
1917 crime films
German black-and-white films
1910s German films
1910s German-language films